Volodymyr Ivanovich Byelyayev (born 7 December 1944) is a Ukrainian former volleyball player who competed for the Soviet Union in the 1968 Summer Olympics.

He was born in the Michurinsk, Russian SFSR.

In 1968, he was part of the Soviet team which won the gold medal in the Olympic tournament. He played eight matches.

External links
 
 

1944 births
Living people
People from Michurinsk
Russian men's volleyball players
Ukrainian men's volleyball players
Soviet men's volleyball players
Olympic volleyball players of the Soviet Union
Volleyball players at the 1968 Summer Olympics
Olympic gold medalists for the Soviet Union
Olympic medalists in volleyball
Medalists at the 1968 Summer Olympics
Sportspeople from Tambov Oblast